Ilie Gârleanu (20 July 1930 – August 2018) was a Romanian footballer who played as a striker.

Club career
Ilie Gârleanu was born on 20 July 1930 in Rezina, but in 1940 together with his family he ran away in Craiova, as Bessarabia became occupied by Russians in World War II. He started playing football at junior level at Sportul Muncitoresc Craiova. Afterwards he went to play for a few clubs before settling at Știința Timișoara, where during a spell of nine seasons he won the 1957–58 Cupa României. He has a total of 156 Divizia A matches in which he scored 35 goals. In 2008 Gârleanu received the Honorary Citizen of Timișoara title.

International career
Ilie Gârleanu played one friendly match for Romania, on 19 September 1954 under coach Ștefan Dobay in a 5–1 loss against Hungary.

Honours
Locomotiva Sibiu
Divizia B: 1948–49
CA Câmpulung Moldovenesc
Divizia B: 1951
Flacăra Ploiești
Divizia B: 1953
Știința Timișoara
Divizia B: 1959–60
Cupa României: 1957–58

References

External links
 

1930 births
2016 deaths
Romanian footballers
Romania international footballers
Place of birth missing
Association football forwards
Liga I players
Liga II players
FC Steaua București players
FC Petrolul Ploiești players
FC Politehnica Timișoara players
FC CFR Timișoara players
People from Rezina District